Alfamayo River (possibly from Quechua allpa earth, mayu river, "earth river") is a river in Peru located in the Cusco Region, La Convención Province, Huayopata District. It is a right tributary of the Lucumayo, an affluent of the Vilcanota River.

Alfamayo originates south of the Huamanmarca River near the lake Huamanmarcacocha. Its direction is mainly to the southwest. The confluence with the river Lucumayo is near the village Alfamayo.

See also 
 Luq'umayu
 Inka Tampu
 Veronica (mountain)
 Wamanmarka

References

Rivers of Peru
Rivers of Cusco Region